The Battle of the Neva was a battle which took place on September 9, 1708 during the Swedish invasion of Russia in the Great Northern War. While Charles XII had started his offensive against Russia from his winter quarters in Saxony, the Swedish–Finnish army of 12,000 men under the command of Georg Lybecker went in field to interrupt and possibly capture the newly-established ports and town of Saint Peterburg, which had been built on Swedish land. This was intended to draw the attention and troops from the main Russian army facing Charles. The Russian forces stationed in Ingria consisted of 24,500 men of which the command had been appointed to Fyodor Apraksin. While having reached the river of Neva the Swedes under Lybecker prepared their crossing. Apraksin had fortified the opposite bank with about 8,000 men and several boats patrolling the river. 

Lybecker first confused the Russian command of where the possible crossing were to be made and so, on September 9, close to Teusina, his forces started the construction of the bridge. Meanwhile, two Russian brigantines spotted the work and started firing. The Swedes, however, responded with their own cannons and soon the Russian ships had to withdraw. Later after some smaller skirmishes, about 1,200 Swedes were across the river constructing fortifications. The Russians then counterattacked in full force, possibly 8,000 men. However, the Swedes made a fierce stand and the Russians were, after an hour of fighting including a hasty bayonet charge from the Swedes, soundly defeated leaving 900 men dead behind while having an unknown number of wounded. The Swedes lost 86 men dead and 291 wounded in this action. The battle had no real strategic effect as Lybeckers' force could not capture Saint Petersburg due to lack of heavy artillery. Instead, after some further campaigning, Lybecker ran out of supplies and had to retreat to the open water to get his army evacuated back to Finland.  During the evacuation he had to slaughter and leave behind many of his well–needed horses, a circumstance which would have serious consequences in the Russian invasion of Finland.

References

Conflicts in 1708
1708 in Europe
Neva
Neva
Neva
History of Leningrad Oblast